The Monster Hunters Survival Guide is a comic book miniseries written by John Paul Russ, and Illustrated by Shawn McCauley and Anthony Spay. It was published by Zenescope Entertainment in July 2011. A paperback was published on August 9, 2011.

Film adaptation 
A feature film was announced in November 2011, produced by Simon Kinberg through his Genre Films banner. Dwayne Johnson was set to star in the film.

References 

2011 comics debuts
2011 books
American comics
Fiction about monsters